Montegrino Valtravaglia is a comune (municipality) in the Province of Varese in the Italian region Lombardy, located about  northwest of Milan and about  west of Varese.  
 
Montegrino Valtravaglia borders the following municipalities: Brissago-Valtravaglia, Cadegliano-Viconago, Cremenaga, Cugliate-Fabiasco, Germignaga, Grantola, Luino, Mesenzana.

References

External links
Official website

Cities and towns in Lombardy